Too Much is the first album by Berlin-based indie punk artist Bonaparte. It was officially released by Bonaparte and Staatsakt label in 2008, although a handmade version was already being sold at their concerts since 2007.

Track listing
All songs written, produced & performed by Tobias Jundt, except where otherwise noted.
"Do You Want to Party" – 1:14
"Who Took the Pill?" – 2:31
"Too Much" – 3:06
"Anti Anti" (T. Jundt, J. Suske) – 3:15
"Ego" – 4:07
"Tú me molas" – 3:49
"Wrygdwylife?" – 3:34
"Blow It Up" (T. Jundt, C. Monnier) – 3:15
"Lvdngrslvngklls" (T. Jundt, J. Suske) – 2:59
"I Can't Dance" – 3:02
"No, I'm Against It!" – 1:52
"A-a-ah" – 3:52
"Bienvenido (Reprise)" – 3:25
"Gigolo Vagabundo" (Bonus Track) – 4:00
"3 Minutes in the Brain of Bonaparte" (Hidden Track) – 3:14

Bonus videos: "Too Much", "I Can't Dance", "Anti Anti", "No, I'm Against It!", "Wrygdwylive?" and "Who Took the Pill?"

Releases
Several versions of the album include alterations in the artwork, in the track list order and additional discs. Some of this versions include:
"Bloody artwork" version with alternate handmade artwork and different track list order. CD. (2007)
Regular edition (15 tracks + bonus videos). CD, red vinyl and digital download. (2008).
Limited edition including Blood, Sweat & Würstchen (live portion of the Remuched album) as a second disc. CD, red/blue vinyl and black vinyl. (2009)

References

2008 debut albums
Bonaparte (band) albums